Melbourne Victory FC is an Australian women's soccer team affiliated with Melbourne Victory FC and Football Federation Victoria. Founded in 2008, the team is one of the representatives of Melbourne in Australia's top-tier domestic competition – the A-League Women.

History

Establishment

Following on from the previous top-division Women's National Soccer League, Melbourne Victory Women linked with the Hyundai A-League men's club but run by Football Federation Victoria (FFV), was a foundation club of the Westfield W-League. With a strong roster boasting Australia's number one goalkeeper Melissa Barbieri and former Matildas star Tal Karp as captain, expectations were high.

Inaugural season

Early signs were positive in the first season with New Zealand international Marlies Oostdam scoring the club's first goal as Victory won their first competitive fixture, defeating Central Coast Mariners 2–0. Despite being on top of the table at the conclusion of Round 3, the next few rounds were lean for Melbourne, and it found itself in the position of needing a win in the final round to make the finals series. With the final round match in the balance, Central Coast Mariners came back to haunt Victory with goals in the 89th and 90th minutes to deny the Victory a play-off spot in the inaugural year. Melissa Barbieri was awarded Goalkeeper of the Year by the league.

2009

The second season proved even more painful as once again Melbourne's finals prospects came down to a last-round showdown, this time against Perth Glory. Needing only a draw to claim fourth spot, late goals again cost Victory as Perth scored in the 81st and 87th meaning the Victorians missed out on finals to Canberra via goal difference.

2010–11

Season 2010/11 saw a change of personnel for Melbourne Victory with new coach Vicki Linton taking charge of a re-shuffled squad. Adjusting to a new system and new teammates, it was a slow start with the team having to wait until Round 4 to claim its first win of the season before finishing the regular season off with a five-match undefeated run.

Finishing in fourth spot, Victory made the finals but succumbed to a strong Sydney FC team 5–1. The team was not quite ready for a title challenge but a maiden finals campaign was an important step forward. 2010/11 also saw the club win its first silverware with a win over Canberra United, seeing it awarded the OCRF Trophy while also taking out the W-League Fair Play Award.

2011–12

If 2010/11 was an important step forward, 2011/12 was a giant leap for Melbourne Victory as it consolidated its place as one of the top teams in Australia. Its most consistent season so far saw it never out of finals contention. Going the entire season undefeated at home – including going within minutes of beating the undefeated Canberra United – Victory finished fourth in the tightest season of the Westfield W-League in history.

Despite a tight 1–0 loss to Canberra in the semi-final it was a successful season with Steph Catley, Ashley Brown, Brianna Davey and Katrina Gorry all making their Matildas debuts while Catley and Brown won Footballer of the Year (Australian Football Fan Awards) and W-League Young Player of the Season respectively. Melbourne Victory also won its second successive W-League Fair Play Award, sharing with Canberra, and retained the OCRF Trophy.

2012–13

Hoping to build on their strong 2011/12 season, the Victory got off to a shaky start in 2012/13 with head coach Vicki Linton resigning only weeks before the season was to kick-off. With her departure Darren Tan was appointed as interim coach until former Gold Coast United coach Mike Mulvey was given the job just days before the opening round.

Having only a squad of 12 players registered going into the match, Melbourne Victory was forced to sign three more players due to FFA regulations before going on to lose 2–0 to Perth. Despite another loss in Round 2 leaving the team on the bottom of the ladder, a combination of international signings – including stars Petra Larsson and Jessica Fishlock – and players beginning to understand Mulvey's playing system led to a turnaround in form.

With the league's best defence, Melbourne finished the regular season in third place losing only a single match after Round 2. Even so, the team had to contend with more issues as Mulvey left following Round 9 to take up an A-League contract with Brisbane Roar, while Fishlock's guest contract ended after Round 10. A dramatic semi-final win over Perth Glory extended the side's historic undefeated streak to seven and allowed it to host the 2012/13 Westfield W-League grand final at AAMI Park, although it fell to Sydney FC 3–1. Despite this, Steph Catley was awarded W-League Young Player of the Year and Mike Mulvey W-League Coach of the Year.

Players

Current squad

Notable former players

Below is a list of notable footballers who have previously played for Melbourne Victory Women. Generally, this means players that have played 50 or more first-class matches for the club. However, some players who have played fewer matches are also included, are the club's integral founding members, were integral members of a championship winning team, have at least one senior international cap or made significant contributions to the club's history.

Managers

Honours
W-League/A-League Women:
Champions (3): 2013–14, 2020–21, 2021–22
Premiers (1): 2018–19

Continental record

Year-by-year history

Records and statistics

Records
 Record Win: 5–0 vs Perth Glory, Week Eight (Season 2011/12), 10 December 2011 & 5–0 vs Adelaide United, Round Seven (Season 2012/13), 1 December 2012
 Record Defeat: 5–1 vs Sydney FC, 6 February 2011, Semi Final (Season 2010/11)
 Record High Attendance: 8,599 vs Perth Glory, AAMI Park, Melbourne, 10 February 2019
 Most Goals by a Player in a Game: 3 – Caitlin Friend v Adelaide United, Veneto Club, Bulleen, 19 November 2011 & Jodie Taylor v Perth Glory, 6PR Stadium, Perth, 10 December 2011
 Most Wins in a Row: 3 – 3 November 2012 to 17 November 2012
 Longest Undefeated Streak: 7 matches – 1 December 2012 to 20 January 2013
 Most Goals In a Regular season: Jodie Taylor – 8 goals, 2011–12 W-League
 Longest Period Without Conceding a Goal: 316 minutes – 18 December 2010 to 23 January 2011. Goalkeeper: Brianna Davey (7 minutes) & Melissa Barbieri (309 minutes)

Most appearances
Maika Ruyter-Hooley holds the record for most league appearances with 54 (including finals) as of January 2013

Last updated 29 January 2013
Competitive, professional matches only.

Leading scorers

Jodie Taylor holds the record for most league goals with 12 (including finals) as of January 2013.

Last updated 29 January 2013
Competitive, professional matches only, appearances including substitutes appear in brackets.

See also
 List of top-division football clubs in AFC countries
 Women's soccer in Australia
 W-League (Australia) all-time records
 Australia women's national soccer team

References

External links
 Melbourne Victory official website

 
Melbourne Victory FC
A-League Women teams
Women's soccer clubs in Australia
2008 establishments in Australia

pl:Melbourne Victory#Sekcja kobiet